Beautiful Stories for Ugly Children is a comic book series written by Dave Louapre and illustrated by Dan Sweetman, published by DC Comics through their Piranha Press imprint from June 1989 until September 1992. The series saw a total of 30 issues. A trade paperback, titled A Cotton Candy Autopsy, reprinted issues #1 and #13, and concluded the story told in those issues with a previously unpublished third part.

The promotional material said that the title would be restarting in a 128-page quarterly anthology format with the first issue being titled, What If This Were Heaven, Wouldn't That Be Hell?. Despite the plan to continue publishing in this format, this would actually be the final Beautiful Stories for Ugly Children story to be released.

An image from A Cotton Candy Autopsy was used as the cover for Mr. Bungle's debut album.

Original series
 Issue #1: A Cotton Candy Autopsy
 Issue #2: The Dead Johnsons' Big Incredible Day
 Issue #3: Diary of a Depressed Tap Dancer
 Issue #4: The Black Balloon
 Issue #5: The Crypt of The Magi
 Issue #6: Happy Birthday to Hell
 Issue #7: Ricky The Doughnut Boy
 Issue #8: Die Rainbow Die
 Issue #9: By The Light of The Screaming Moon
 Issue #10: Where The Tarantulas Play
 Issue #11: The Daffodils of Plague Town
 Issue #12: Beneath The Useless Universe
 Issue #13: A Cotton Candy Autopsy II - Bingo And Addy's Escape
 Issue #14: Dangerous Prayers
 Issue #15: The Pagan Tourist
 Issue #16: The Santas of Demotion Street
 Issue #17: A Conspiracy of Sweaters
 Issue #18: The Neutered Beast
 Issue #19: Nice Girls Don't Massacre Ants
 Issue #20: Arnold: Confessions of a Blood Junkie
 Issue #21: Dances With Cows
 Issue #22: Psychotronic Virgin
 Issue #23: Tiny Slimy, Writhing Thing
 Issue #24: I Am Paul's Dog
 Issue #25: Legion of Ogs
 Issue #26: Dead Like Me
 Issue #27: The No-Wax Killing Floor
 Issue #28: The Guilty Orphan
 Issue #29: Gravity Sucks
 Issue #30: The Dream is Dead - Gone, Shot Off, All Squashed Flat
 A Cotton Candy Autopsy trade paperback
 What If This Were Heaven, Wouldn't That Be Hell?
 Ashcan - collects twelve pages of What If This Were Heaven, Wouldn't That Be Hell?

References

1989 comics debuts